Bulgaria competed at the 2022 Winter Olympics in Beijing, China, from 4 to 20 February 2022.

The Bulgarian delegation consisted of ten men and six women competing in six sports. Biathlete Maria Zdravkova and snowboarder Radoslav Yankov were named as co-flagbearers for the team at the opening ceremony. Originally biathlete Milena Todorova was scheduled to be flagbearer at the opening ceremony, but for was replaced by Zdravkova as Todorova was scheduled to compete in the mixed relay the following day. A volunteer served as the flagbearer during the closing ceremony.

Competitors
The following is a list of the number of competitors who participated at the Games per sport/discipline.

Alpine skiing

Bulgaria qualified 2 men and 1 female competitors.

Biathlon

Bulgaria qualified a team of 4 men and 4 women.

Men

Women

Mixed

Figure skating

In the 2021 World Figure Skating Championships in Stockholm, Sweden, Bulgaria secured one quota in the ladies singles competition.

Luge

Based on the results during the 2021–22 Luge World Cup season, Bulgaria qualified 1 sled in the men's singles.

Ski jumping

Bulgaria qualified 1 male athlete.

Snowboarding

Bulgaria qualified 1 male athlete.

Non-competing sports

Cross-country skiing

By meeting the basic qualification standards Bulgaria qualified one male cross-country skier. The Bulgarian Olympic Committee had nominated Simeon Deyanov, but was ruled out of the Olympics after testing positive for COVID-19.

References

Nations at the 2022 Winter Olympics
2022
Winter Olympics